Rudolf Kristian Albert Broby-Johansen (25 November 25, 1900 – 9 August  1987) was a Danish art historian, communist activist and writer.
Born in Aalborg, North Jutland to a working-class family, Broby-Johansen grew up in Lunde, Otterup Municipality, Funen. 
He published a poetry collection in 1922 called Blod ("Blood"), containing poems on the themes of misery and poverty as well as tabooed topics such as prostitution and necrophilia, was considered scandalous and confiscated by the authorities (re-published in 1968). However, it has gained long-lasting influence in Danish literature by influencing such poets as Michael Strunge and Yahya Hassan. Moreover, it is seen as a prime example of Danish modernist and expressionist poetry. 
He joined the Communist Party of Denmark (DKP) and became one of the key  personalities behind several Danish  left-wing journals such as Monde, Plan and Frem.

Broby-Johansen ended his political activism in 1935, following the exile of Leon Trotsky and the persecution of Trotskyism in the Soviet Union,  and he focused on artistic work. Among his publications on art history are works on costume history and the history of painting.
As art historian, he was also responsible for the reconstruction of the colouring of the copy of the greater Jelling stone commissioned in the 1930s, which he dubbed "Denmark's baptismal certificate".  
He also published a children's book (Gaga og siksak, holger og dig, 1949) and a Danish re-telling of Aesop's Fables (Den lille Æsop 1945; Den danske Æsop 1961).
He returned  to political activism in the 1960s in support of Maoism and the Chinese Cultural Revolution, and in the 1970s he campaigned against the accession of Denmark to the European Communities. He re-joined the DKP a few years before his death, in 1983.

As the author of several books, he received the  Holberg Medal (1970), the Danish Authors' Association's Prize of Literature (1975), the LO's Culture Prize (1980), the PH Prize (1984) and a nomination for an honorary doctorate at the University of Odense (1985).

References

Olav Harsløf (ed.), Rudolf Broby-Johansen – en central outsider i det 20. århundrede, Museum Tusculanum (2000).
Morten Thing, Portrætter af 10 kommunister (1996).

External links
Broby Johansen, Rudolf (leksikon.org 2008)

Danish communists
Trotskyists
Danish art historians
20th-century Danish non-fiction writers
1900 births
1987 deaths
Danish children's writers
People from Aalborg